Muriel Louise Wilhelmi (May 5, 1925 - July 27, 2015) was an American artist who began painting  professionally in the 1970s and continued until the end of her life at the age of ninety years. Muriel was born in St. Paul, Minnesota, and spent her adult life on the West Coast of the United States in California and Oregon. Muriel was inspired by her love of the simple life and painted typical Americana scenes, historical inns, the countryside, old barns, and seascapes. Her early works were oil paintings and later works done in watercolor were often reproduced in limited edition prints and cards.

Early life

Muriel grew up on a small family-owned farm during the Great Depression. Her parents, Henry and Alma Stahnke, mostly raised chickens and grew food for the family, but also sold eggs and fresh produce to neighbors. The oldest of five children, Muriel helped out at home and took on babysitting jobs to earn her own money. One day, at church, a guest speaker gave a demonstration in painting. Muriel was completely captivated and her love of art was born.

In 1946, after WWII, Muriel met and married her lifelong partner, Eugene "Jerry" Jerome Wilhelmi. The couple headed west to California, where Jerry attended California State University, Chico, and Muriel began having their four children. By the early 1950s, they had moved to Costa Mesa, California, where Jerry became a metal shop teacher at the Santa Ana High School and Muriel started the Costa Mesa Preschool. By the mid 1970s, their children were grown, Jerry was ready to retire and Muriel wanted to get back to the garden, so they sold their preschool. They were ready for new adventures and headed for Northern California.

Art career
In 1975, Muriel and Jerry moved to Mendocino, California, where they purchased the original Gordon house on Gordon Lane. The old farmhouse was a short walk from the ocean bluffs and was situated on seven acres with barns, a chicken coop, and a water tower. In this artisan community, surrounded by inspiration, Muriel took up art instruction and began painting prolifically. She attended a number of classes and workshops by renowned artists including Leonard Sheu, Charles Tito, Charles Becker, George Post, Olaf Palm, Don O'Neil, LaVere Hutchings, Tom Lynch, Tony Couch, and E. John Robinson.

Eventually, Muriel and Jerry opened The Village Art Gallery on Lansing Street in Mendocino, California.  The gallery was visited by people from around the world and exhibited Muriel's paintings and the works of twelve other artists from the area.

Next, Muriel and Jerry moved further north to Florence, Oregon in 1991, where Muriel quickly submerged herself in that artisan community. She became a featured artist at the Backstreet Gallery, a co-op gallery of local artists on Bay Street in Old Town Florence. Muriel continued to sell her paintings and work as an attendant at the Backstreet Gallery, until her final year at the age of ninety.

Muriel's art has also been displayed in various shows and venues around California's Mendocino County, and in the Florence, Oregon area including at the Florence Event Center, The Blue Heron Art Gallery, the annual Florence Rhododendron Festival, the Siuslaw Library, Ona's Art Gallery in Yachats, and the Mind Power Gallery in Reedsport.

Muriel won numerous awards in California and Oregon, and was also a member of the Florence Regional Arts Alliance, the Watercolor Society of Oregon, the California Watercolor Society, and the Plein Air Painters of Mendocino. Her career as a painter of fine art began when she was about fifty years of age and spanned forty years.

Print or Original?

Today the artworks of Muriel Wilhelmi are in many private collections in the U.S. and abroad. Of her paintings done in oil, at least one, Rough Sea, was made available in a limited amount of prints on canvas. Muriel's original watercolor paintings were often made available in prints. The originals are typically signed on the front, often using her first name only, or combining the M and the W when using both first and last names. Her limited edition prints are signed below the printed signature, on the white border, or in pencil on the mat.

The first set of four prints were done by lithography and included Big River, The Village of Mendocino, Albion Flats, and Old Gordon House. This set was reproduced in a limited number of poster size prints and in folded greeting cards. In addition to this set, The Village Art Gallery poster and prints were reproduced by lithography printing.

The second group of prints were photographic prints done by CaliColor, a company specializing in reproducing artwork. These photographic prints were mounted to foam core board and given a matte spray finish to reduce shine. There are approximately thirty scenes that were reproduced in this manner and were usually limited to 100 - 200 prints. These were done during the time of selling at the Village Art Gallery, in Mendocino, California.

The third group of reproductions were giclée or high-resolution inkjet prints that were done from about 1990 and afterwards. Some of the large sized prints were printed onto watercolor paper, making it more difficult to discern from an original piece.

Gallery

References

American women painters
21st-century American painters
20th-century American painters
1925 births
2015 deaths
20th-century American women
21st-century American women